Goss may refer to:

Places 
Goss, Georgia, a place in Georgia, United States
Goss, Mississippi, United States
Goss, Missouri, United States
Göss Abbey (Stift Göß), Leoben, Austria
Goss Moor, Cornwall, United Kingdom
Goss Stadium at Coleman Field, Oregon State University, United States

Other uses 
Goss (surname)
Goss crested china, a brand of porcelain 
The Goss Ministry of the government of Queensland, Australia
Goss v. Lopez, U.S. Supreme Court case
Goss zeta function in mathematics
Short for Gossamer (fabric), the traditional material used for the body of a top hat
Short for gossip

See also 

Government of Southern Sudan (1972–1983) 
Government of Southern Sudan (2005–2011) 
Government of South Sudan, current
Justice Goss (disambiguation)